George Arthur Hunt (born August 3, 1949) is a former American football placekicker in the National Football League (NFL) who played for the Baltimore Colts and the New York Giants. He played college football at University of Tennessee.

References 

Living people
Tennessee Volunteers football players
1949 births
American football placekickers
Baltimore Colts players
New York Giants players
Players of American football from Marietta, Georgia